Klaus Thomas Steindl (born 20 June 1966 in Graz, Austria) is an author, scriptwriter & director, film producer and owner of the company KREATIVkraft e.U.  His primary focus is on nature and investigative documentaries that deal with internationally relevant issues, particularly in the field of Outstanding Biographies. Most of his award-winning documentaries have been produced for the international prime-time market.

Career 
Steindl studied directing and stage design at the University of Music and Performing Arts in Graz. In 1987 his professor Wolfram Skalicki encouraged him to take on the role of assistant director to Lotfi Mansouri at Opéra de Nice (“Hérodiade”). He then worked as a freelance director for experimental theater performances before entering the field of film in 1991. After directing several award-winning commercials Steindl decided to focus on producing documentary films.

In 2017 the European art and culture broadcaster ARTE opened its one-week anniversary program "25 Years of ARTE" with the German/French premiere of Steindl's feature-film-length docu-drama "Venice and the Ghetto".

Promoting Fresh Talent 
As well as producing and directing films, Klaus Steindl is involved with promoting and supporting young and new talents. He developed the educational concept and the first curriculum for the „Film und Medien Initiative“, a Graz-based film academy for children and adolescents. Furthermore, he was a member of the board of the Documentary Campus and a member of the commission for film funding in Styria, Austria, for several years. Over the years CINESTYRIA Film Commission has been successful in attracting large international film productions to the region. For example, several scenes from the James Bond film Spectre were shot at Styria's Altaussee lake.

Productions 
In the course of his career Steindl has produced over 30 primetime documentaries. More than half of them were devised as international productions in several languages, produced with European and U.S. partners and broadcast around the globe. As well as producing high-quality wildlife and nature documentaries - like the successful Wild Venice, shown from Russia to the US, Steindl focuses on investigative films that deal with internationally relevant historical themes. His research has frequently led to new scientific discoveries, most recently in The Nero Files - Uncovering an Ancient Conspiracy and Lost City of Gladiators - Carnuntum. For his film Vampire Princess he discovered the historical inspiration for Bram Stoker's legendary Dracula character:

"Picture a spectacular vampire attack at the tomb of an Austrian princess. A scene from Stephenie Meyer's "Twilight" series? No. It's the deleted opening to Bram Stoker's "Dracula," a horror classic that many experts believe was actually based on a woman. Archaeologists, historians, and forensic scientists revisit the days of vampire hysteria in the eighteenth-century Czech Republic and re-open the unholy grave of dark princess Eleonore von Schwarzenberg. They uncover her story, once buried and long forgotten, now raised from the dead." Official Info Smithsonian Channel

Steindl has also played a significant role in the development of the docudrama genre. The writer and director has recently begun to focus more on the field of Human interest. As a director, he is increasingly interested in genre-spanning narrative film direction.

Klaus T. Steindl works closely with internationally renowned research facilities while developing and producing his films. Partners have included Yale University and the University of Arizona for The Voynich Code, University of Oxford in the U.K. and ETH Zurich in Switzerland for The Mona Lisa Mysteries and the Washington and Lee University in Lexington for "The Nero Files". He was granted access to Cold War intelligence files stored in the KGB and FSB archives in Moscow for the film Margarethe Ottillinger. In his docu drama "Venus of Willendorf - The Naked Truth" the statuette of a naked woman provides a starting point for a ground-breaking scientific re-interpretation of the relationship between Stone Age men and woman (since Facebook banned the 29,500 years old artwork of the Stone Age for being "dangerously pornographic" the just 11 centimeteres tall statuette became an interantional celebrity).  

Several of Steindl's works have been accepted into the libraries of European and U.S. universities. Many have been adapted for use in schools in a variety of forms and have received the European "Comenius EduMedia" Award for Educational Media.
 
The Miami Jewish Film Festival shows Steindl´s film "Rothschild Saga" in the "Official Selection 2023" (North America Premiere). Official film description:
"This rich and nuanced portrait of the remarkable, elusive Rothschild family uncovers the story behind the family's phenomenal economic success. The film tells the dynasty’s incredible saga, from the confines of the Frankfurt ghetto to the halls of royal palaces, all the while emphasizing the importance they placed on family unity and the profound role Judaism played in their lives, later using their influence to assist oppressed Jews throughout Europe. A definitive work of documentary cinema with a thoroughly engaging narrative, The Rothschild Saga brings their mysterious and fascinating history to life."

Filmography (excerpt) 
 1994: From the "Etrich Taube" to the Mail Rocket - The history of Austrian aviation (with Niki Lauda)
 1996: Signs of the Time - The history of writing
 2000: The secrets of the gardens (with André Heller)
 2000: Through the wild alps
 2002: Tracking down composers
 2006: Peter Rosegger - Forest farmer lad and revolutionary
 2007: The Vampire Princess
 2008: Let it snow!
 2009: The Voynich-Code - The world's most mysterious manuscript
 2012: The Secret of the Mona Lisa
 2012: The Alps from above
 2012: The Tulip Bubble
 2013: The Mona Lisa Mystery
 2014: Wild Venice
 2014: Forest of Fantasies
 2014: The Sword in the Stone
 2014: Mysterious Schönbrunn
 2015: Lake Constance - Wilderness on the Water
 2015: Lost City of Gladiators - Carnuntum
 2016: Margarethe Ottillinger - The woman who knew too much (with Ursula Strauss)
 2016: Venice and the Ghetto
 2017: The Nero Files - Uncovering an ancient conspiracy
2018: Mythos Hallstatt - Dawn of the Celts / Mystery of the Celtic Tomb
2021: Rothschild Saga. Rise – Riches – Repercussions (with Alina Fritsch)
2021: Venus of Willendorf - The Naked Truth

Awards & Festivals

References

External links 
 Klaus T. Steindl on IMDb
 www.kreativkraft.com – Official website
 Wild Venice (English) on youtube
 Lost City of Gladiators - Carnuntum (English) on youtube
 Venise et son ghetto (French) on youtube
 Vampire Princess (English) on youtube
 Let it Snow! (English) on youtube
 Wild Venice (Russian) on youtube

1966 births
Living people
20th-century Austrian writers
21st-century Austrian writers
Austrian film directors
Austrian film producers
Austrian male writers
Writers from Graz
Film people from Graz